Union Sportive Arlequins Perpignanais, also referred to as USA Perpignan or Perpignan, is a French professional rugby union club founded in 1933 and based in Perpignan, in the Pyrénées-Orientales department. They compete in the Top 14, France's elite division of rugby.

The club is a result of a merger between US Perpignan and Arlequins Perpignanais in 1933. US Perpignan was also born from a union of merging clubs AS Perpignan (founded in 1902) and Stade Olympien Perpignanais, which took place in 1919.

Its home ground is the 14,593-capacity Stade Aimé Giral but important fixtures may occasionally be taken to Estadi Olímpic Lluís Companys, in Barcelona. The club's colours are sky blue, scarlet and golden yellow, which derived from the Catalan Senyera and gives Perpignan its nickname Les Sang et Or (French for "The Blood and Golds").

History

Early years
One of the two merging clubs was established in 1902 as AS Perpignan. It would be in 1914 that the club would go on to make its first ever final appearance. On 3 May, Perpignan defeated Stadoceste Tarbais 8–7 at Stade des Ponts Jumeaux in Toulouse in front of 15,000 people. 19-year-old fly-half Aimé Giral converted a late try and went on to become captain. 14 months after their victory, Aimé Giral died alongside seven other members of the team at the outbreak of WW1 and, to honour their sacrifice, it was decided to colour USAP jersey like a Poilu uniform and to name the stadium after Giral.

Four years after the championship in 1914, the club was renamed as US Perpignan after a merging with Stade Olympien Perpignanais. Under the new club name, US Perpignan made it to the final of the French championship three seasons after the change. On 17 April 1921, Perpignan defeated Stade Toulousain 5–0 at Parc des Sports de Sauclières in Béziers and thus claiming their second championship. Three seasons later, the finalists of 1921 would meet again in the final of 1924, though this time Toulouse won the game 3–0 in Bordeaux.

The success continued throughout the 1920s, and following the final defeat of the 1924 season, US Perpignan were able to make it to the final of the 1925 season. They faced US Carcassonne in Narbonne, and defeated them 5–0 to win the 1925 Championship. For the third season in a row, US Perpignan made it to the final. The opponents were Stade Toulousain once again, the two sides had each defeated each other once in a final in recent years. Toulouse won 11–0 in Bordeaux. After their prominence in the mid-1920s, Perpignan's final appearance in 1926 was their last for nearly a decade.

Perpignan's next final appearance came in 1935 against Biarritz at Stade des Ponts Jumeaux in Toulouse on 12 May, with Biarritz winning 3–0. That season they also won the Challenge Yves du Manoir. Three seasons later Perpignan were again involved in the Championship final against Biarritz. The final was played on 8 May, and this time, Perpignan defeated Biarritz, winning 11–6 to claim their first Championship since 1921. They were also runners-up of the Challenge Yves-du-Manoir that same season as well.

The success continued throughout the late 1930s, with Perpignan again being runners-up of the Challenge Yves du Manoir in 1936. It was also the 1936 season that Biarritz and Perpignan would face off in the Championship. Both of Perpignan's last two final appearances were against Biarritz, and both Perpignan and Biarritz had won one each against each other. The final took place on 30 April, and Biarritz turned out to be victorious, defeating Perpignan 6–0. Two years later, Perpignan were in the final of the Challenge Yves du Manoir, but became runners-up.

Their next final appearance would not be until the season of 1944. Perpignan played Aviron Bayonnais at Parc des Princes in Paris on 26 March to decide who would be the champions of France. Perpignan won, defeating Aviron Bayonnais 20–5, claiming their first Championship since 1938.

Perpignan would have to wait another eight years until they would make it to the final again. In the 1952 season, Perpignan met FC Lourdes in the final at Stadium Municipal in Toulouse, where they went down to FC Lourdes 20–11. However, both sides would meet in another final three years later to decide the 1955 Championship. This time Perpignan emerged victorious, defeating FC Lourdes 11–6 in Bordeaux. Perpignan also won the Challenge Yves du Manoir during the 1955 season, and were runners-us the following year as well.

Perpignan won the Challenge Yves du Manoir in 1965, but made their first final appearance 20 years after 1955, to decide the 1977 season Championship. They met AS Béziers in the final, who defeated Perpignan 12–4 at Parc des Princes. Perpignan won the Challenge Yves du Manoir in 1994,

Professional era
They would next appear in the final in 1998, where they went down to Stade Français 34–7 in Paris in front of 78,000 people.

In 2002, the club entered into a partnership with the University of Barcelona Rugby Union Club, hence renaming them USAP Barcelona, which compete in the División de Honor, the national Championship in Spain. Perpignan made it to the 2004 final, where they met Stade Français, who defeated them in the 1998 final. Stade Français won again, 38–20 at Stade de France in front of 79,722 people.

In European competition, Perpignan reached the final stage in 2003 (losing 21–17 to Toulouse in Dublin Lansdowne Road) after losing a 1999 semi-final in Toulouse Stadium against Colomiers. They were beaten in the quarter-finals in Lansdowne Road again in 2006 by eventual winners Munster.

They signed All Blacks fly-half Dan Carter, widely regarded as one of the world's best players, on a six-month deal starting from December 2008. Carter's stint at Perpignan, however, ended prematurely when he tore an Achilles tendon.

Their season ended by progressing into the Top 14 semi-final with a 25–21 win over Stade Français and eventually winning it with a fantastic 22–13 win over ASM Clermont Auvergne in the final. In 2010, they advanced to the final again against Clermont, but they saw Les Jaunards end decades of frustration by winning their first championship final in 11 tries.

In 2011 they signed a twinning agreement with FC Barcelona of Spain, which proposes USAP to be promoted through FC Barcelona.

Club honours
Top 14
Champions (4): 1913–14 (as AS Perpignan), 1920–21 (as US Perpignan), 1924–25 (as US Perpignan), 1937–38, 1943–44, 1954–55, 2008–09
Runners-up: 1923–24 (as US Perpignan), 1925–26 (as US Perpignan), 1934–35, 1938–39, 1951–52, 1976–77, 1997–98, 2003–04, 2009–10
 Challenge Yves du Manoir
Champions (3): 1935, 1955, 1994
Runners-up: 1936, 1937, 1938, 1956, 1965
Heineken Cup
Runners-up: 2002–03
Pro D2
Champions (2): 2017–18, 2020–21
Notes

Finals results

French championship

Heineken Cup

Current standings

Current squad

The squad for the 2022–23 season is:

Espoirs squad

Notable former players

 
  Federico Martín Aramburú
  Bautista Delguy
  Rimas Álvarez Kairelis
  Alejandro Allub
  José Orengo
  Sebastian Bozzi
  Ryan Cross
  Daniel Herbert
  Justin Purll
  Robins Tchale-Watchou
  Mike James
  Phil Murphy
  Alex Brown
  Perry Freshwater
  Richard Haughton
  Dan Luger
  Luke Narraway
  Tim Stimpson
  Tevita Cavubati
  Samueli Naulu
  Alipate Ratini
  Eroni Sau
  Ben Volavola
  Watisoni Votu
  Christophe André
  Puig Aubert
  Franck Azéma
  Mathieu Barrau
  Armand Batlle
  Noël Brazès
  Pascal Bomati
  Benoît Bourrust
  Élie Brousse
  Gilbert Brutus
  Benoît Cabello
  Jacques Cabero
  Didier Camberabero
  Daniel Camiade
  Julien Candelon
  Florian Cazenave
  Frédéric Cermeno
  Damien Chouly
  Georges Coste
  Joseph Crespo
  Marc Dal Maso
  Vincent Debaty
  Joseph Desclaux
  Sébastien Descons
  Nans Ducuing
  Sylvain Dupuy
  Nicolas Durand
  Jérôme Fillol
  Julien Fritz
  Jean Galia
  Charles Geli
  Aimé Giral
  Bernard Goutta
  Raoul Got
  Paul Goze
  Jean-Philippe Grandclaude
  Guilhem Guirado
  Sofiane Guitoune
  Raphaël Ibañez
  Jean-Francois Imbernon
  Melvyn Jaminet
  David Janin
  Jacques Jorda
  Thierry Lacroix
  Mickaël Ladhuie
  Julien Laharrague
  Nicolas Laharrague
  Gregory Le Corvec
  Marc Lièvremont
  Matthieu Lièvremont
  Thomas Lièvremont
  Camille Lopez
  Ludovic Loustau
  Brice Mach
  Lionel Mallier
  David Marty
  Nicolas Mas
  Jo Maso
  Sami Mavinga
  Maxime Mermoz
  Joffrey Michel
  Romain Millo-Chluski
  Olivier Olibeau
  Vincent Planté
  Christophe Porcu
  Jerome Porical
  Laurent Sempéré
  Jérôme Schuster
  Farid Sid
  Jean-Marc Souverbie
  Romain Taofifénua
  Sébastien Taofifénua
  Jérôme Thion
  Sébastien Vahaamahina
  Yohann Vivalda
  Quentin Walcker
  Dimitri Basilaia
  Giorgi Jgenti
  Davit Kubriashvili
  Mick O'Driscoll
  Paddy Jackson
  Tommaso Allan
  Tommaso Benvenuti
  Ramiro Pez
  Dan Carter
  Scott Robertson
  Eric Sione
  Răzvan Mavrodin
  Marius Tincu
  Ovidiu Tonita
  Johan van Heerden
  Rudi Coetzee
  Gavin Hume
  Steve Meyer 
  Wandile Mjekevu
  Percy Montgomery
  Gert Muller
  Jacques-Louis Potgieter
  Kirill Kulemin
  Manu Leiataua
  Henry Tuilagi
  Chris Cusiter
  Nathan Hines
  Alasdair Strokosch
  Raphaël Bastide
  Mathieu Bélie
  David Mélé
  Lifeimi Mafi
  Tevita Mailau
  Sione Piukala
  Kisi Pulu
  Sona Taumalolo
  Viliami Vaki
  William Leon Jefferson
  Richard Parks
  James Hook
  Luke Charteris

See also
 List of rugby union clubs in France
 Rugby union in France

Notes

References

External links
  USA Perpignan Official website
  Official fans site of Perpignan in Paris 
 Data, results, etc from ITS rugby

 
Perpignan
Rugby clubs established in 1902